Pic de Montcalm is a French pyrenean summit, culminating at , located in the Ariège department, Midi-Pyrénées region of France.

Topography 
Located in the Ariège south of Auzat in the Vicdessos, it lies slightly north of the Franco-Spanish borderline crest.

La pique du Montcalm (Ariège appellation), la pique d'Estats and the pic du port de Sullo are the three main summits of the massif du Montcalm, the last two bordering Spain and la Pica d'Estats the highest summit in Catalonia.

The summit is located in the perimeter of the parc naturel régional des Pyrénées ariégeoises.

History 
The first ascent was made on July 18, 1807 by Augustin Pyramus de Candolle along with guide Simon Faure

Access 

On the French side, three main itineraries are possible :
 by the Pinet refuge, located next to the lac du Pinet: the path (tagged red and white) is the easiest (namely downhill) and most used itinerary.
 by the Soulcem valley and the Riufret couloir: some passages are difficult going downhill. It is poorly signed.
 by the vallon de Pujol and the Pla Subra: which used to be the conventional track, used by the first Pyrenean pioneers. The route begins at the  chalet du Montcalm (also called "Refuge du Montcalm") located by the route de l'Artigue, 1 km after the hamlet of Marc. The route gradually lost its status as the normal route due to certain difficult passages, below and above the Tables du Montcalm.

On the Spanish side: by the Val Ferrera, from the Pica d'Estats from which one can reach the Montcalm by the col de l'Estats, French side.

References 

Mountains of the Pyrenees
Landforms of Ariège (department)
Pyrenean three-thousanders